British rock band Bush has released eight studio albums, one live album, two compilation albums, and 29 singles released on Interscope Records. The band had released four studio albums before separating in 2002. They reunited in 2010 and have since released four studio albums.

Albums

Studio albums

Live albums

Compilation albums

Singles 

Notes

A"Letting the Cables Sleep" did not peak on the US Billboard Hot 100 chart, but peaked at number 13 on the Bubbling Under Hot 100 chart, which acts as a 25 song extension of the Hot 100.
B"The People That We Love" did not peak on the US Billboard Hot 100 chart, but peaked at number 14 on the Bubbling Under Hot 100 chart, which acts as a 25 song extension of the Hot 100.
C"The Sound of Winter" did not peak on the US Billboard Hot 100 chart, but peaked at number 4 on the Bubbling Under Hot 100 chart, which acts as a 25 song extension of the Hot 100.

Promotional singles

Videography

Video releases

Music videos

References

Discographies of British artists
Rock music group discographies